Local elections were held in Cebu City on May 9, 2022 within the Philippine general election. Registered voters of the city will be electing candidates for the following elective local posts: mayor, vice mayor, district representative, and eight councilors at-large for each district. There are two legislative districts in the city.

Background 

Prior to his death on November 19, 2021, then mayor Edgardo Labella chose not to seek re-election in 2022, paving the way for then vice mayor Michael Rama to seek a return to his old post as mayor. Rama, who previously served as mayor from 2010 to 2016, teamed up with incumbent city councilor Raymond Alvin Garcia as his candidate for vice mayor whom he competed against for the position of vice mayor in 2007 but has since become allies when the latter's political party KUSUG endorsed Rama's re-election in 2013.

Margarita Osmeña, a former city councilor and wife of former mayor Tomas Osmeña, has also decided to throw her hat into the mayoral race together with incumbent city councilor Franklyn Ong as her candidate for vice mayor. Ong is currently serving as Kasambagan barangay captain and as ex officio member of the Cebu City Council representing the Liga ng mga Barangay - Cebu City Chapter. Osmeña has previously served as acting mayor from May 17, 2016 to June 30, 2016 with the suspension of then mayor Rama. If elected, Osmeña will be the first woman mayor of the city.

Several personalities have also filed their candidacies such as incumbent city councilor David Tumulak as mayor, former city administrator Bimbo Fernandez as vice mayor, actor and businessman Richard Yap as representative of Cebu City's 1st congressional district, and former mayor Tomas Osmeña as representative of Cebu City's 2nd congressional district. However, Osmeña withdrew his candidacy days before the substitution deadline and was replaced by BG Rodrigo Abellanosa, son of Rodrigo Abellanosa.

Term-limited and retiring incumbents 

The following are "third-termers", who are term limited.

Congressional representative 
 Rodrigo Abellanosa (BOPK/LDP)

Councilors 
 David Tumulak (BARUG/Nacionalista)
 Eugenio Gabuya Jr. (BOPK/LDP)

Candidates

Official candidates 
The Commission on Elections is expected to publish a final list of accepted candidates by early 2022.

Filed certificates of candidacies 
The following have filed certificates of candidacies, formally notifying the commission that they are running.

Mayor 
 October 4
 Edgar Concha Jr. (Independent), call center agent
 October 7
 Margarita Osmeña (BOPK/LDP), former city councilor, term limited in 2019
 Crisologo Saavedra Jr. (Independent), businessman
 David Tumulak (Independent), incumbent city councilor
 October 8
 Jose Layon (Reporma)
 Juanito Luna (Independent)
 Michael Rama (BARUG/PDP–Laban), incumbent vice mayor and former mayor

Vice Mayor 
 October 4
 Bimbo Fernandez (Liberal Party), former undersecretary of interior and local government and former city administrator
 Fernandez was initially endorsed by a group of non-government organizations to run for mayor but opted to run for vice mayor.
 October 5
 Franklyn Ong (BOPK/LDP), incumbent city councilor and president of Liga ng mga Barangay - Cebu City Chapter
 October 8
 Raymond Alvin Garcia (KUSUG/PDP–Laban), incumbent city councilor

1st District Representative 
 October 3
 Richard Yap (NUP), actor and businessman, lost election in 2019
 October 5
 Rachel del Mar (BOPK/NPC), former representative of Cebu City's 1st congressional district
 October 8
 Prisca Niña Mabatid (BARUG/PDP–Laban), incumbent city councilor
 Manuel Momongan (Independent)
 Avenescio Piramide (Lakas–CMD)

2nd District Representative 
 October 8
 Eduardo Rama Jr. (BARUG/PDP-Laban), incumbent city councilor

1st District Representative 
 October 1
 Gian Aznar (PROMDI), former seafarer and teacher
 October 5
 Lea Ouano-Japson (PROMDI/LDP), incumbent city councilor
 Winston Pepito (Reporma), incumbent Bacayan barangay councilor
 Joy Augustus Young (BOPK/LDP), incumbent city councilor and former vice mayor
 October 7
 Sisinio Andales (BOPK/LDP), former city councilor
 Nestor Archival (BOPK/LDP), incumbent city councilor
 Alvin Arcilla (BOPK/LDP), former city councilor
 Arturo Barrit (BOPK/LDP), spokesperson of Associated Labor Union-Trade Union Congress of the Philippines (ALU-TUCP)
 Alvin Dizon (BOPK/LDP), incumbent city councilor
 October 8
 Pastor Alcover Jr. (BARUG/PDP–Laban), former city councilor, lost re-election in 2019
 Maria Buanghug (BARUG/PDP–Laban), vendors group leader
 Mary Ann de los Santos (BOPK/LDP), former city councilor
 Roland Empleo (Katipunan ng Kamalayang Kayumanggi)
 Joel Garganera (Independent), incumbent city councilor
 Jerry Guardo (BARUG/PDP–Laban), incumbent city councilor
 Edwin Jagmoc (Independent), former city councilor
 Emmanuel Labella (Independent), brother of mayor Edgardo Labella
 Edgardo Labella II (BARUG/PDP–Laban), son of mayor Edgardo Labella, lost election in 2016
 Reynald Lauron (PANAGHIUSA/Aksyon Demokratiko), incumbent Cambinocot barangay captain
 Melvin Legaspi (BARUG/PDP–Laban), lawyer
 Peter Mancao (BARUG/PDP–Laban), deputy task force leader of the city's Covid-19 vaccine rollout
 Noel Eleuterio Wenceslao (BARUG/PDP–Laban), former city councilor, lost re-election in 2016

2nd District Councilor 
 October 5
 Raul Alcoseba (BOPK/LDP), incumbent city councilor
 October 6
 Alejandro Cabido (Independent)
 Janet Calleno (Independent)
 October 7
 Josephine Abella-Maglasang (BOPK/LDP), sister of the late Atty. Amay Abella
 Gremar Barete (BOPK/LDP), incumbent Buhisan barangay captain
 Roberto Cabarrubias (BOPK/LDP), former city councilor
 Cornelio Jaca (BOPK/LDP), retired Municipal Trial Courts in Cities judge
 Omar Kintanar (BOPK/LDP), incumbent Cogon Pardo barangay councilor
 Ana Gabriela Beatriz Osmeña (BOPK/LDP), daughter-in-law of former mayor Tomas Osmeña
 October 8
 Raymundo Crystal (PANAGHIUSA)
 James Anthony Cuenco (BARUG/PDP–Laban), incumbent city councilor
 Assumed office on September 15, 2020 to replace his father, Antonio Cuenco.
 Alan Dinampo (Katipunan ng Kamalayang Kayumanggi)
 Harry Eran (BARUG/PDP–Laban), incumbent Cogon Pardo barangay captain
 Pancrasio Esparis (BARUG/PDP–Laban), incumbent Quiot barangay captain
 Rey Gealon (BARUG/PDP–Laban), incumbent city legal officer 
 Donaldo Hontiveros (Independent), incumbent city councilor
 Renato Osmeña Jr. (BARUG/PDP–Laban), incumbent city councilor
 Samuel Panilagao (Independent)
 Jocelyn Pesquera (BARUG/PDP-Laban), former city councilor
 Simeon Romarate (PANAGHIUSA), incumbent Division for the Welfare of the Urban Poor (DWUP) head
 Phillip Zafra (Independent), incumbent city councilor

Candidates who withdrew 
These are the candidates who have filed candidacies, but later withdrew:
 Michael Bantasan (NUP)
 On October 8, Bantasan filed to run for representative of Cebu City's 2nd congressional district. On October 12, Bantasan withdrew his candidacy.
 Tomas Osmeña (BOPK/LDP), former mayor
 On October 7, Osmeña filed to run for representative of Cebu City's 2nd congressional district. On November 12, Osmeña withdrew his candidacy and was substituted by BG Rodrigo Abellanosa, son of Rodrigo Abellanosa.
 Michael Matañoza (PROMDI)
 On October 8, Matañoza filed to run for mayor of Cebu City. On November 15, Matañoza withdrew his candidacy.
 Clifford Jude Niñal (BOPK/LDP), incumbent San Nicolas Proper barangay captain
 On October 7, Niñal filed to run for 2nd district councilor of Cebu City. On November 15, Niñal withdrew his candidacy and was substituted by Jose Lorenzo Abellanosa, son of Rodrigo Abellanosa.

Declined to be candidates

For mayor 
 Rodrigo Abellanosa (BOPK/LDP), incumbent representative of Cebu City's 2nd congressional district
 Abellanosa considered running for city mayor but ultimately gave way to Margarita Osmeña.
 Chuck Barandog, police official
 Tomas Osmeña (BOPK/LDP), former mayor and former representative of Cebu City's 2nd congressional district

For 1st District representative 
 Mary Ann de los Santos (BOPK/LDP), former city councilor
 De los Santos, who unsuccessfully ran for vice mayor in 2019, opted to run for city councilor.
 Mariano Osmeña (PROMDI), businessman

For 2nd District representative 
 Jocelyn Pesquera (BARUG/PDP-Laban), former city councilor
 Pesquera, who unsuccessfully ran for representative of Cebu City's 2nd congressional district in 2019, opted to run for city councilor.

For 1st District councilor 
 Garry Lao, former Cebu City Office for Substance Abuse Prevention head and incumbent City of Lapu-Lapu Office for Substance Abuse Prevention head

For 2nd District councilor 
 Gerardo Carillo, former city councilor
 Jessica Resch, incumbent Sangguniang Kabataan Federation - Cebu City president

Non-candidates 
 Antonio Cuenco (BARUG/PDP–Laban) – Died on June 27, 2020.
 Served his first term as Cebu City councilor.
 Raul del Mar (BOPK/Liberal) – Died on November 16, 2020.
 Served his third and last term as representative of Cebu City's 1st District.
 Edgardo Labella (BARUG/PDP–Laban) – Died on November 19, 2021.
 Did not seek re-election for mayor of Cebu City.

Opinion polling

Mayoralty and vice mayoralty elections

Mayor 
Margarita Osmeña, a former city councilor and wife of former mayor Tomas Osmeña, is challenging incumbent mayor Michael Rama for the position of mayor. Outgoing city councilor David Tumulak has also joined the race as an independent candidate.

Vice mayor 
Incumbent city councilors Raymond Alvin Garcia and Franklyn Ong are competing for the position of vice mayor along with former city administrator Bimbo Fernandez.

District representatives

1st District 
Actor Richard Yap is running again as 1st district representative after losing to the late Raul del Mar in the 2019 elections. Yap will face off with former party mate and incumbent city councilor Prisca Niña Mabatid and del Mar's daughter Rachel, who previously served as the district's representative from 2010 to 2013.

2nd District 
BG Rodrigo Abellanosa is eyeing to succeed his father, incumbent district representative Rodrigo Abellanosa. He will face off against Eduardo Rama Jr., an incumbent city councilor and nephew of incumbent mayor Michael Rama.

City Council elections 

Incumbents are expressed in italics.

By ticket

Laban ng Demokratikong Pilipino/Bando Osmeña – Pundok Kauswagan

Partido Demokratiko Pilipino-Lakas ng Bayan/Partido Barug/Kugi Uswag Sugbo

Aksyon Demokratiko

Katipunan ng Kamalayang Kayumanggi

Partido Panaghiusa

Partido Para sa Demokratikong Reporma

PROMDI

Independents

By district

1st District 
Key: Italicized: incumbent

2nd District 
Key: Italicized: incumbent

Notes

References 

2022 Philippine local elections
Elections in Cebu City
May 2022 events in the Philippines